Nuyol is the eight album from Puerto Rican folk singer Roy Brown. The album was released under Brown's label Discos Lara-Yarí in 1983.

Background and recording

Nuyol was recorded from October to November 1983 at Eurosound and Latin Sound Studios in New York City. The title of the album and its eponymous song, which refers to New York City, comes from a poem from Federico García Lorca. The album also features Brown's second adaptation of a Luis Palés Matos poem in "Ohé Nené". Like in previous Brown albums, there are two songs based on poems from Juan Antonio Corretjer: "Diana de Guilarte" and "Ayuburí". There are also writing contributions from American writers and activists Langston Hughes and June Jordan in "Drum" and "Now you know" respectively. Both songs are in English, as well as "The Drums of Monimbó", penned by Brown. This is the first album from him to feature songs in English.

Track listing

Personnel

Musicians 
 Roy Brown - guitars
 Carl Royce - cuatro
 Pablo Nieves - percussion
 Jeff Fuller - bass
 Robert "Robi" Ameen - drums
 Steve Sandberg - piano
 Cecilia Engelhart

Recording and production 
 David Rodríguez - recording

Notes 

1983 albums
Roy Brown (Puerto Rican musician) albums